Dig is a small combo jazz album recorded by Toshiko Akiyoshi in 1993 and released on the Nippon Crown record label.

Track listing
"Dig" (Davis) – 7:58 
"Lament" (Johnson) – 7:10 
"Lazy Days" (Akiyoshi) – 7:04 
"Harlequin Tears" (Akiyoshi) – 6:46 
"Uptown Stroll" (Akiyoshi) – 6:31 
"Morning Of The Carnival" (Bonfá, Maria) – 7:46 
"Mucura" (trad.) – 5:39

Personnel
Toshiko Akiyoshi – piano 
Conte Candoli – trumpet 
Walt Weiskopf – tenor saxophone  
Peter Washington – bass 
Kenny Washington – drums

References

Toshiko Akiyoshi albums
1993 albums